A Louth County Council election was held in County Louth in Ireland on 24 May 2019 as part of that year's local elections. All 29 councillors were elected for a five-year term of office from 5 local electoral areas (LEAs) by single transferable vote.

The 2018 LEA boundary review committee altered the divisions used in the 2014 elections by splitting the ten-seat Drogheda Borough District into two LEAs. Its terms of reference required no change in the total number of councillors but set a lower maximum LEA size of seven councillors. Other LEA seat allocations were unchanged but boundary adjustments were necessitated by population shifts revealed by the 2016 census. The changes were enacted by statutory instrument (S.I.) No. 626/2018 and tweaked by S.I. No. 6/2019.

Following the elections Sinn Féin and Fianna Fáil emerged as the joint largest party with 7 seats. Sinn Féin lost 1 seat in Dundalk and 2 in Drogheda. Fianna Fáil gained a seat from Sinn Féin and also from the Green Party in Dundalk. Accounting for the defection of Kevin Callan after 2014, Fine Gael returned with 5 seats, a loss of 2 seats overall. The Labour Party increased their numbers by 1 seat to 3 by gaining another seat in Drogheda.

Kevin Callan won a seat in each of the 2 Drogheda LEAs. He will now have to decide which one he wishes to represent. The casual vacancy was filled at a meeting of the full Council on 17 June 2019 by Declan Power, who had run for Fianna Fáil in 2019 but who had since quit the party.

Results by party

Results by local electoral area

Ardee

Drogheda Rural

Drogheda Urban

Dundalk–Carlingford

Dundalk South

Results by gender

Changes Since 2019
† Drogheda Rural Independent Cllr Kevin Callan resigned his seat on 17 June 2019 as he had been elected for both LEAs. Former Fianna Fáil candidate, Declan Power, was co-opted to fill the vacancy.
†† Drogheda Rural Fine Gael Cllr Oliver Tully died on 9 July 2019. On 16 September 2019 his widow Eileen Tully was co-opted to fill the vacancy.
††† Dundalk South Sinn Féin Cllr Ruairí Ó Murchú was elected as a Teachta Dála (TD) for Louth at the 2020 general election. Former Cllr Kevin Meenan was co-opted to fill the vacancy on 24 February 2020.
†††† Dundalk-Carlingford Fine Gael Cllr John McGahon was elected to the Seanad on the Cultural and Educational Panel on 31 March 2020. John Reilly was co-opted to fill the vacancy on 20 July 2020.
††††† Dundalk-Carlingford Fianna Fáil Cllr Erin McGreehan was nominated by the Taoiseach to the Seanad in June 2020. Andrea McKevitt was co-opted to fill the vacancy on 20 July 2020.
†††††† Drogheda Labour Cllr Paul Bell resigned his seat on 28 June 2020 upon his appointment by the Government to the Labour Court. On 21 September 2020 Fiachra MacRaghnaill was co-opted to fill the vacancy.
††††††† Ardee Fine Gael Cllr Colm Markey was co-opted as a Member of the European Parliament on 20 November 2020 following the appointment of Mairead McGuinness MEP as an EU Commissioner. Paula Butterly was co-opted to fill the vacancy on 16 February 2021.

Footnotes

Sources

References

2019 Irish local elections
2019